Diplocalyptis nigricana is a species of moth of the family Tortricidae. It is found on the island of Shikoku in Japan.

References

Archipini
Moths of Japan
Endemic fauna of Japan
Moths described in 1975